One Spring Day is the second Korean studio album (and third overall) by South Korean boy band 2AM.
For this album, 2AM is planning for a musical transformation. A sneak preview of the song's introduction showcases Lim Seulong′s voice being prominent and different. The lead track is "One Spring Day", with a slow piano melody, for which a teaser video was released on 27 February 2013.

Track listing

Chart performance

One Spring Day 
References are as follows:

Other charted songs

References

External links 
 Official Website

2013 albums
JYP Entertainment albums
Korean-language albums
2AM (band) albums
Hybe Corporation albums